The 1930 Massachusetts Aggies football team represented Massachusetts Agricultural College in the 1930 college football season. The team was coached by Charles McGeoch and played its home games at Alumni Field in Amherst, Massachusetts. The 1930 season was the team's last as M.A.C., as the school would change their name to Massachusetts State College the following year. Massachusetts finished the season with a record of 1–8.

Schedule

References

Massachusetts
UMass Minutemen football seasons
Massachusetts Aggies football